In the C++ programming language, argument-dependent lookup (ADL), or argument-dependent name lookup, applies to the lookup of an unqualified function name depending on the types of the arguments given to the function call. This behavior is also known as Koenig lookup, as it is often attributed to Andrew Koenig, though he is not its inventor.

During argument-dependent lookup, other namespaces not considered during normal lookup may be searched where the set of namespaces to be searched depends on the types of the function arguments. Specifically, the set of declarations discovered during the ADL process, and considered for resolution of the function name, is the union of the declarations found by normal lookup with the declarations found by looking in the set of namespaces associated with the types of the function arguments.

Example 
An example of ADL looks like this:
namespace NS {

class A {};

void f(A& a, int i) {}

}  // namespace NS

int main() {
   NS::A a;
   f(a, 0);  // Calls NS::f.
}

Even though the  function is not in namespace NS, nor is namespace NS in scope, the function  is found because of the declared types of the actual arguments in the function call statement.

A common pattern in the C++ Standard Library is to declare overloaded operators that will be found in this manner. For example, this simple Hello World program would not compile if it weren't for ADL:
#include <iostream>
#include <string>

int main() {
  std::string str = "hello world";
  std::cout << str;
}
Using << is equivalent to calling operator<< without the std:: qualifier.  However, in this case, the overload of operator<< that works for string is in the std namespace, so ADL is required for it to be used.

The following code would work without ADL (which is applied to it anyway):

#include <iostream>

int main() {
  std::cout << 5;
}

It works because the output operator for integers is a member function of the std::ostream class, which is the type of cout. 
Thus, the compiler interprets this statement as
std::cout.operator<<(5);  
which it can resolve during normal lookup. However, consider that e.g. the const char * overloaded operator<< is a non-member function in the std namespace and, thus, requires ADL for a correct lookup:

/* will print the provided char string as expected using ADL derived from the argument type std::cout */
operator<<(std::cout, "Hi there")

/* calls a ostream member function of the operator<< taking a void const*,  
which will print the address of the provided char string instead of the content of the char string */ 
std::cout.operator<<("Hi there") 
The std namespace overloaded non-member operator<< function to handle strings is another example:
/*equivalent to operator<<(std::cout, str). The compiler searches the std namespace using ADL due to the type std::string of the str parameter and std::cout */
std::cout << str; 
As Koenig points out in a personal note, without ADL the compiler would indicate an error stating it could not find operator<< as the statement doesn't explicitly specify that it is found in the std namespace.

Interfaces 
Functions found by ADL are considered part of a class's interface. In the C++ Standard Library, several algorithms use unqualified calls to swap from within the std namespace. As a result, the generic std::swap function is used if nothing else is found, but if these algorithms are used with a third-party class, Foo, found in another namespace that also contains swap(Foo&, Foo&), that overload of swap will be used.

Criticism
While ADL makes it practical for functions defined outside of a class to behave as if they were part of the interface of that class, it makes namespaces less strict and so can require the use of fully qualified names when they would not otherwise be needed. For example, the C++ standard library makes extensive use of unqualified calls to std::swap to swap two values. The idea is that then one can define an own version of swap in one's own namespace and it will be used within the standard library algorithms. In other words, the behavior of
namespace N {

struct A {};

}  // namespace N

A a;
A b;

std::swap(a, b);
may or may not be the same as the behavior of
using std::swap;
swap(a, b);
(where a and b are of type N::A) because if N::swap(N::A&, N::A&) exists, the second of the above examples will call it while the first will not. Furthermore, if for some reason both N::swap(N::A&, N::A&) and std::swap(N::A&, N::A&) are defined, then the first example will call std::swap(N::A&, N::A&) but the second will not compile because swap(a, b) would be ambiguous.

In general, over-dependence on ADL can lead to semantic problems. If one library, L1, expects unqualified calls to foo(T) to have one meaning and another library, L2 expects it to have another, then namespaces lose their utility. If, however, L1 expects L1::foo(T) to have one meaning and L2 does likewise, then there is no conflict, but calls to foo(T) would have to be fully qualified (i.e. L1::foo(x) as opposed to using L1::foo; foo(x);) lest ADL get in the way.

References

External links
 Argument-dependent lookup
 What's In a Class? – The Interface Principle by Herb Sutter
 Namespaces and the Interface Principle by Herb Sutter
 Why I Hate Namespaces by Danny Kalev
 "A Modest Proposal: Fixing ADL (revision 2)" by Herb Sutter

C++
Articles with example C++ code